Murder Live! is an American made-for-television film that first aired on NBC on March 9, 1997. Directed by Roger Spottiswoode, the film stars Marg Helgenberger, David Morse and Peter Horton, who also co-write the film.

Plot
Pia Postman (Helgenberger) hosts a self-titled tabloid talk show, a program grieving father Frank McGrath (Morse) takes offense to after his daughter commits suicide as a direct result of being humiliated on the show. He then disguises himself as a member of the audience during a live episode of the show, and takes Postman hostage wearing a bomb jacket, threatening to kill himself, Postman, and the audience if the police intervene.

Cast
Marg Helgenberger as Pia Postman
David Morse as Frank McGrath
Teri Garr as JoAnn McGrath
Peter Horton as Lt. Clay Maloney
Christine Estabrook as Dr. Christine Winter
Lauren Tom as Marge Fong
Neal McDonough as Hank Wilson
Eloy Casados as Tony Grenaldi
John O'Hurley as Hal Damon

References

External links

1997 television films
1997 films
NBC network original films
Films about hostage takings
Films directed by Roger Spottiswoode
Films scored by Gary Chang
1990s English-language films